André Nicolle (1 June 1885 – 25 February 1945) was a French film actor.

Selected filmography
 The Chocolate Girl (1927)
 Karina the Dancer (1928)
 The Vein (1928)
 Temptation (1929)
 The Unknown Dancer (1929)
 Miss Europe (1930)
 Accused, Stand Up! (1930)
 Once Upon a Time (1933)
 The Scandal (1934)
 Personal Column (1939)
 Whirlwind of Paris (1939)
 Beating Heart (1940)
 A Cage of Nightingales (1945)

References

Bibliography
 Phillips, Alastair. City of Darkness, City of Light: Émigré Filmmakers in Paris, 1929-1939. Amsterdam University Press, 2004.

External links

1885 births
1945 deaths
French male film actors
French male silent film actors
20th-century French male actors
Male actors from Paris